The Dutch Rugby Union is the governing body for rugby union in the Netherlands. It was founded in 1932 and became affiliated to the International Rugby Football Board, in 1988 known as the International Rugby Board and now as World Rugby. Netherlands Men's Rugby are ranked 25th (on 12 October 2019) in the world according to World Rugby.

See also
 Rugby union in the Netherlands
 Netherlands national rugby union team
 Netherlands national U20 rugby union team
 Netherlands national rugby sevens team
 Netherlands women's national rugby union team
 Netherlands women's national rugby sevens team
 Ereklasse

External links
 Nederlandse Rugby Bond – Official Site 

Rugby union in the Netherlands
Rugby union governing bodies in Europe
Rugby
Sports organizations established in 1932